Sharsheret may refer to:

Sharsheret (organization)
Sharsheret, Israel, a moshav in Israel